Parablechnum articulatum, synonym Blechnum articulatum, is a species of fern in the family Blechnaceae. The common name is rosy water fern. Often seen growing on wet stream banks, at higher altitudes in tropical Queensland, Australia.

References

Blechnaceae
Flora of Queensland
Taxa named by Ferdinand von Mueller